"Devils Haircut" is a song by the American musician Beck, released as the second single from his fifth album, Odelay (1996). It peaked at number 94 on the US Billboard Hot 100, number 23 on the Billboard Modern Rock Tracks chart and number 22 on the UK Singles Chart. Q Magazine included it in their list of the "1001 Best Songs Ever" in 2003.

Critical reception
Justin Chadwick from Albumism picked "Devils Haircut" as one of the "unequivocal standouts" of the Odelay album, describing it as "rollicking, breaks-driven" and "exhilarating, pop-friendly fare". British magazine Music Week rated it four out of five, viewing it as "double bass-heavy eccentricity with a definite commercial edge from the talented US singer/songwriter." The reviewer added, "This one sticks in the mind." David Sinclair from The Times declared it as "a typically aberrant mixture of beatbox pop and punk poetry from the gifted Californian oddball."

Music video
The accompanying music video for the song is directed by Mark Romanek. It features Beck walking through various New York City locations, wearing cowboy attire and carrying a boombox. At some points, the action freezes and the camera zooms in on Beck in tableau. Later the camera zooms in on spies that have been following Beck the whole time. The video has references to the films Midnight Cowboy and The 400 Blows.

At the 1997 MTV Video Music Awards, Beck won a total of five awards. Three were for "The New Pollution" and "Devils Haircut" won two: Best Editing and Best Male Video.

The video for "Devils Haircut" was later published on YouTube in October 2009. It has amassed more than 10.5 million views as of September 2021.

Samples

As is common with his Odelay-era songs, "Devils Haircut" is driven by a number of samples: the drums in the choruses and drum breaks come from Pretty Purdie's "Soul Drums"; the drumbeat during the verses comes from Them's cover of James Brown's "Out of Sight"; and the guitar riff was taken from another Them track, "I Can Only Give You Everything" (written by Scott and Coulter), replayed by Beck rather than sampled.

Track listings
 7"
 "Devils Haircut"
 "Lloyd Price Express"

12"
A1 "Devils Haircut" (LP Version) (3:13)
A2 "Devils Haircut" (Dark And Lovely) (3:38)
A3 "Devils Haircut" (American Wasteland) (2:43)
B1 "Where It's At" (Lloyd Price Express) (4:57)
B2 "Clock"(2:43)

CD #1
 "Devils Haircut" [LP Version]
 "Devils Haircut" [Remix by Noel Gallagher]
 "Groovy Sunday" [Remix by Mike Simpson]
 "Trouble All My Days"

CD #2
 "Devils Haircut" [LP Version]
 "Dark and Lovely" [Remix by Dust Brothers]
 "American Wasteland" [Remix by Mickey P.]
 ".000.000"

Personnel
Beck: lead and backing vocals, electric guitar, bass, harmonica, organ, drum samples
The Dust Brothers: turntables, drum samples
Written by Beck/The Dust Brothers
Programmed by Beck/The Dust Brothers

B-sides and remixes 
"Devils Haircut" was released with a number of B-sides, which included many remixes:

CD #1 includes two remixes. One by Noel Gallagher of Oasis, and the other by Mike Simpson of The Dust Brothers. The former adds a roaring guitar, emphasized over all other instruments on the track while the latter is a more jazzy take on the song, packed with added percussion and jazz horns.

CD #2 includes "Dark and Lovely", another sample-laden Dust Brothers remix, and "American Wasteland", by Mickey P, which transforms the song into a fast, hardcore punk style song.

Both CDs had one original B-side in addition to the remixes. CD #1 had "Trouble All My Days", an early song from 1993 which is characterized by deep, distorted vocals and Beck's thrashing his loosely tuned strings. "Trouble All My Days" had been featured on "Pay No Mind (Snoozer)", Golden Feelings and two other releases prior to its inclusion on "Devils Haircut" CD #1.

CD #2 features "000.000," a previously unreleased song with a strange, minimalistic instrumental background and difficult to discern lyrics. "000.000" was also released on "The New Pollution".

Another remix, "Richard's Hairpiece", was done courtesy of Aphex Twin, in which the riff is removed, and Beck's vocals are sped up to the extent that his voice is extremely high-pitched. This remix was not included on either CD version of "Devils Haircut", because of Aphex Twin's delay in making it, but it was included on the subsequent CD for "The New Pollution".

Charts

Popular culture
 Beck guest-starred on the episode of sci-fi American cartoon sitcom Futurama entitled "Bendin' in the Wind" in 2001. He says to Bender, "When I'm upset I write a song about it. Like when I wrote 'Devils Haircut', I was feeling really...really...what's that song about?" as an allusion to the song's oblique lyrics.
 Bob Dylan made reference to the song and its lyrical complexity on his weekly XM Satellite Radio show: "We're talkin' about the Devil here on Theme Time Radio Hour. And the Devil always looks sharp. One of the reasons he looks sharp is that he had a good haircut. Here's Beck to tell you all about it. This is from his hit album Odelay, produced by the Dust Brothers. Beck says 'This song is a really simplistic metaphor for the evil of vanity.' I just thought you could dance to it."
 Scottish band Travis mention "Devils Haircut" (along with Oasis's "Wonderwall", and the Manic Street Preachers' "A Design for Life") on "Slide Show", a song from their 1999 "The Man Who" album. "'Cause there is no design for life, There's no devil's haircut in my mind, There is not a wonderwall to climb to climb or step around"
 "Devils Haircut" plays at the beginning of the first episode of the CW television series Reaper.
 The song appears in the film The Big Sick.

References

External links
 Whiskeyclone discussion of Devils Haircut
 

1996 singles
Beck songs
MTV Video Music Award for Best Male Video
Music videos directed by Mark Romanek
Songs written by Beck
Song recordings produced by Dust Brothers
Songs written by John King (record producer)
Songs written by Michael Simpson (producer)
1996 songs
DGC Records singles